Squishy McFluff: The Invisible Cat! is a 2014 children's chapter book by Pip Jones and illustrated by Ella Okstad. Published by Faber and Faber, it is about a little girl called Ava and her invisible friend, a cat called Squishy McFluff, who initially causes trouble around the family home but eventually learns to behave.

Publication history
2017, USA, Paw Prints 
2014, England, Faber & Faber

Reception
A review in Booklist of Squishy McFluff wrote "This playful early chapter book will attract emergent readers with its rhyming text, widely spaced lines, and sweet red-and-blue illustrations.", and Publishers Weekly called it "a punchy rhyming escapade".

Squishy McFluff has also been reviewed by the following book reviewers: Kirkus Reviews, School Library Journal, and Booktrust.

It won the 2012 Greenhouse Funny Prize.

References

External links
Library holdings of Squishy McFluff

2014 children's books
British children's books
Books about cats
Fiction about invisibility